Sung Ching Commercial Co., Ltd, doing business as Matsusei Supermarket was a grocery store chain in Taiwan. The company head office was in Xizhi District, New Taipei City.

As of 2004, Matsusei had 80 stores. On Saturday May 22, 2004 it opened a luxury store in Tianmu, Shilin District, Taipei. Unlike other Matsusei stores, this one had "Matsusei" in Roman characters at the entrance instead of Chinese characters. Matsusei owned the Marukyu supermarket brand. In 2015, the company was sold to PX Mart.

References

External links

 Matsusei 

Retail companies of Taiwan
Supermarkets of Taiwan
Defunct companies of Taiwan